Nodus Domini was a planned Czech video game by Cybernetic Cinema, in development from 1996 to 1997.

References 

Video games developed in the Czech Republic